In mathematics, the theta function of a lattice is a function whose coefficients give the number of vectors of a given norm.

Definition
One can associate to any (positive-definite) lattice Λ a theta function given by

The theta function of a lattice is then a holomorphic function on the upper half-plane. Furthermore, the theta function of an even unimodular lattice of rank n is actually a modular form of weight n/2. The theta function of an integral lattice is often written as a power series in  so that the coefficient of qn gives the number of lattice vectors of norm 2n.

References

Theta functions